Robert Berry Eaton (August 5, 1871 – June 13, 1964) was a farmer, service man and provincial politician from Alberta, Canada. He served as a member of the Legislative Assembly of Alberta from 1913 to 1921.

Political career
Eaton ran for a seat to the Alberta Legislature for the first time in the 1913 Alberta general election. He defeated former Conservative leader and MLA Albert Robertson in a closely contested race.

Eaton was acclaimed to his second term in the 1917 Alberta general election under section 38 of the Elections Act. The section stipulated that an incumbent member may not be challenged and returned automatically in his district if he is involved with the Canadian Forces overseas in World War I.

Eaton ran for a third term in the 1921 Alberta general election. He would be defeated in a landslide by United Farmers candidate Gordon Forster.

Eaton attempted to run for a seat in the House of Commons of Canada as a Liberal candidate in the 1925 Canadian federal election in the electoral district of Acadia. He would be defeated by Incumbent member Robert Gardiner finishing second in the three-way race.

References

External links
Alberta Legislature Members Listing

Alberta Liberal Party MLAs
Canadian military personnel of World War I
Candidates in the 1925 Canadian federal election
1871 births
1964 deaths
People from Truro, Nova Scotia
Liberal Party of Canada candidates for the Canadian House of Commons